Transform is the fourth studio album by American rock band Powerman 5000, released May 20, 2003. It is an enhanced CD that includes the videos for "Free" and "Action", the album's two singles.

Musical and visual style
Transform marked, both musically and visually, an obvious change from Powerman 5000's previous science fiction theme. Recording began in July 2002 and saw the band composed songs in a simpler, more straightforward manner with less emphasis on industrial metal and nu metal elements and heaviness. The video for its lead single, "Free", also demonstrated the band's visual stylistic detour; rather than space costumes, the majority of band members are dressed in denim while performing in a red room covered in graffiti, creating a colorful, punk rock influenced edge.

The album artwork contains symbols reminiscent of the Amphisbaena. Adorning the CD artwork are four two-headed arrows wrapped back pointing at each other, the outermost one sprouting two extra arrows for a total of six on the right, and underneath the CD are two worm like creatures face to face forming a circle.

Commercial performance 
The album sold 39,000 copies in its first week to chart at #27 on the Billboard 200. It stayed on the chart for 9 weeks. The album had sold 148,561 copies in the U.S. before the band was dropped from DreamWorks Records in December of that year.

Tour
In support of the album, the band announced they would begin touring through the U.S. in April, along with Stone Sour and Ra. They would also go on to appear as the musical guest on Jimmy Kimmel Live! (where they performed their song "Action"), and The Late Late Show (where they performed their song "Free"), respectfully. The band would also later begin to embark on a headlining tour along with Mudvayne and V Shape Mind, starting in September and performing in festivals such as X-Fest.

However, when DreamWorks Records was bought out by Interscope Records, the label pulled their touring support for Powerman 5000 in the middle of the tour, forcing the band to withdraw from their tour.

In other media
"Action" featured on NASCAR Thunder 2004 and was used as its introductory screen's theme.
"Transform" was featured in Midway Entertainment's hockey game NHL Hitz Pro.
"Free" was featured on the New Jersey Devils 2003 Stanley Cup Championship video.

Track listing

Personnel 
 Spider One – vocals
 Mike "M.33" Tempesta – guitar
 Adam "12" Williams – guitar, additional programming, additional production, additional recording, additional editing
 Siggy "00" Siursen – bass
 Adrian "ad" Ost – drums
 Trixie Starr – additional vocals on "That's Entertainment"

Production
 Joe Barresi – producer, recording
 Dan Leffler – assistant engineer
 Scott Oyster – assistant engineer
 Chris Ohno – assistant engineer
 Chris Lord–Alge – mixing
 Dan Druff – guitar tech
 Bruce Jacoby – drum tech
 Mauro Rubb – drum tech
 Ron Handler – A&R

Chart positions
Album – Billboard (United States)

Singles – Billboard (United States)

References

Powerman 5000 albums
2003 albums
Albums produced by Joe Barresi
DreamWorks Records albums